Aydan Calafiore, also known as simply AYDAN, is an Australian singer best known for being one of the four finalists in the seventh season of The Voice Australia in 2018 and for his role as main cast member in Network Ten's 2012 reboot of Young Talent Time. He performed in Eurovision - Australia Decides in February 2019 on the Gold Coast.

Personal life

Calafiore grew up and currently resides in Moonee Ponds, Victoria, with his parents Melanie and Phil Calafiore, along with his two sisters.

Career

2012: Young Talent Time

In 2012, Calafiore was the youngest cast member of Network Ten’s reboot of Young Talent Time at the age of eleven. When the show finished in May, he went on tour with his fellow cast members and performed in live shows.

2013: Australia’s Got Talent

In 2013 Calafiore auditioned for Australia’s Got Talent season 7, singing Justin Bieber's "As Long as You Love Me". He made it to the semi-finals, where he performed "Classic" by MKTO, and was eliminated in the first semi-final in September.

2018: The Voice

In 2018, Calafiore took part in the seventh season of The Voice Australia, where he joined Joe Jonas's team where he made it all the way to the final in the competition on 17 June 2018. He was placed fourth.

 denotes fourth place.

In July 2018 Calafiore released "Something About You" on Universal Music Australia.

Eurovision – Australia Decides

On 18 December, 2018, it was confirmed that Calafiore would perform on the Gold Coast as a contestant in Eurovision - Australia Decides. In January 2019, Calafiore released "Dust" as his entry to represent Australia  at the Eurovision Song Contest 2019. He finished at 6th place in the public vote and 4th place in the jury panel, finishing in 6th place overall.

Fangirls 
Calafiore performed as Harry, from the biggest boy band, True Connection in the 2019 and 2021 tours of Yve Blake's musical, Fangirls. The album comes out on April 30, though he was unable to star as Harry so his role was taken over by Blake Appelqvist.

Discography

Singles

References

External links
 
 

Living people
Calafiore, Aydan
The Voice (Australian TV series) contestants
Year of birth missing (living people)
21st-century Australian singers
Australia's Got Talent contestants
People from Moonee Ponds, Victoria
Singers from Melbourne